The 2018–19 Delhi Dynamos FC Season was the club's fifth season in Indian Super League since their establishment in 2014. This was also the club's last season as Delhi Dynamos FC before relocating to Odisha to get rebranded as Odisha FC.

Pre-season and friendlies
This time Delhi Dynamos will do their pre-season in two phases. In the first phase they will train in Kolkata to get accustomed with Indian condition after that they will go to Doha to train in Aspire Academy for their final preparation before Indian Super League.

On 16 August 2018, they started their first phase of pre season with Indian players in Kolkata under the watchful eyes of assistant coach Mridul Banerjee. They played 2 friendly games with local clubs Taltala Dipti Sangha and Peerless SC. Beating both clubs comfortably by 3-0 and 4-0 respectively.

On 5 September 2018, They flown to Doha to train in Aspire Academy. Where they played 3 friendly games with local UAE clubs.

Players

Current squad

Indian Super League

Table

References 

Odisha FC seasons
Delhi Dynamos